Donovan Peoples-Jones (born February 19, 1999), also known as "DPJ", is an American football wide receiver and return specialist for the Cleveland Browns of the National Football League (NFL). He played college football at Michigan and was drafted by the Browns in the sixth round of the 2020 NFL Draft.

Early life
Donovan Peoples-Jones was born in Detroit on February 19, 1999, to Roslyn Peoples and Eddie Jones. He attended Cass Technical High School where he was a five-star recruit and rated as the best wide receiver recruit from the state of Michigan since Charles Rogers in 2000. Peoples-Jones was named the 2016 Michigan High School Football Player of the Year by MLive Media Group on Nov. 22, 2016. As a senior at Cass Tech, Peoples-Jones had 60 receptions for 1,071 yards and 17 touchdowns. On December 15, 2016, he committed to play for the University of Michigan in a nationally televised press conference on ESPN2.

College career

After committing to Michigan, Peoples-Jones enrolled early in January 2017. After watching Peoples-Jones and fellow freshman Tarik Black in spring practice, offensive lineman Mason Cole predicted the pair were "going to be unbelievable."

On September 2, 2017, Peoples-Jones started at punt returner as a true freshman in Michigan's season opener against Florida. He returned five punts for 40 yards, including an 18-yard return. In his second game, he ran 44 yards on a jet sweep in the first quarter against Cincinnati. In his third game, he returned two punts for 104 yards, including a 79-yard return for a touchdown in the third quarter against Air Force. His 79-yard return for a touchdown was the longest by any Michigan punt returner since Steve Breaston went 83 yards against Indiana in 2006. He finished with the second-most return attempts and eighth-most return yards in a single season by a Wolverine, and also caught 22 passes for 277 yards. Following an outstanding freshman season, he was named a Freshman All-American by Football Writers Association of America and 247 Sports, and was named Michigan's Rookie of the Year.

During the 2018 season, Peoples-Jones led the team with 39 receptions, for 541 yards and seven touchdowns. Peoples-Jones ranked second in the Big Ten in punt return average (10.1) among players with 10 returns or more, and his 64 career return attempts ranks fourth in Michigan program history. On October 20, 2018, in a rivalry game against Michigan State, Peoples-Jones had a career-long reception of 79 yards for a touchdown. Following the season, he was named to the All-Big Ten special teams third-team, by both the coaches and media, and the All-Big Ten offensive teams third-team by coaches.

Following the 2019 season, he was named to the All-Big Ten special teams third-team by the media, and the All-Big Ten offensive team honorable mention by the media. On January 4, 2020, Peoples-Jones announced he would forgo his final season of eligibility to enter the 2020 NFL draft.

College statistics

Professional career

Peoples-Jones was drafted by the Cleveland Browns in the sixth round with the 187th overall pick of the 2020 NFL Draft. Peoples-Jones signed his rookie contract with the Browns on May 20, 2020.

2020 season
On October 25, 2020, Peoples-Jones caught three passes for 56 yards and the game-winning touchdown with 11 seconds left in the game during the 37–34 victory over the Cincinnati Bengals in Week 7. In Week 13 against the Tennessee Titans, Peoples-Jones recorded two catches for 92 yards, including a 75-yard touchdown, during the 41–35 win.   In Week 14 against the Baltimore Ravens, Peoples-Jones recorded three catches for 74 yards and a two-point conversion. He was placed on the reserve/COVID-19 list by the team on December 26, 2020, and activated on December 31.

2021 season
On October 17, 2021, in Week 6, Peoples-Jones caught 4 passes for 101 yards and 2 touchdowns against the Arizona Cardinals, including a Hail-Mary at the end of the first half. The Browns would lose 37-14. In Week 14, Peoples-Jones caught 5 passes for 90 yards in a 24–22 win over the division rival Baltimore Ravens.

2022 season
In Week 13, Peoples-Jones had a 76-yard punt return touchdown in a 27–14 win over the Texans, earning AFC Special Teams Player of the Week.

NFL career statistics

Regular season

References

External links
Cleveland Browns bio
 Michigan Wolverines bio

1999 births
Living people
American football wide receivers
Michigan Wolverines football players
Cass Technical High School alumni
Players of American football from Detroit
Cleveland Browns players